Daniel Teymur (born February 3, 1988) is a Swedish professional mixed martial artist in the lightweight division. He was the Nordic champion in Thaiboxing and he competed in the Ultimate Fighting Championship (UFC).

Background

Teymur and his younger brother David Teymur, started training Muay Thai when he was a teenager. Both of the Teymur brothers grew up watching their older brother, Gabriel Teymur, competing in kickboxing and boxing. Teymur competed in Muay Thai and kickboxing with a record of 27–4 prior to transitioning to MMA. He won Swedish national championship three times in Muay Thai and once in kickboxing and the Muay Thai Nordic championship one time.

Mixed martial arts career

Early career 
Teymur fought his first six fights on the European circuit, racking up a record of 6–0, all in first round finishes (3 by KO/TKO, 3 by submission).

Ultimate Fighting Championship 
In his promotional debut, Teymur faced Danny Henry at UFC Fight Night 113 on July 16, 2017. He lost the bout by unanimous decision. Despite the loss, Teymur was awarded a Fight of the Night bonus award.

Teymur faced Julio Arce on June 1, 2018, at UFC Fight Night 131. He lost the fight via rear naked choke submission in the third round.

Next he fought Chris Fishgold on February 23, 2019, at UFC Fight Night 145. He lost the fight via submission in the second round.

Teymur faced Sung Bin Jo on June 1, 2019, at UFC Fight Night 153. He won the fight by unanimous decision.

Teymur faced newcomer Chase Hooper on December 14, 2019, at UFC 245. He lost the fight via TKO in the first round.

As of February 2020, Teymur is listed as a former fighter on the UFC website.

Personal life 
Teymur's younger brother, David Teymur, is also a MMA fighter and currently signed with the UFC. Both brothers transitioned to MMA from kickboxing and Muay Thai in 2012, making their debuts in 2013. A few years later both got into the UFC. David was signed in 2015 and Daniel in 2017. He is of Assyrian descent.

Championships and accomplishments
Ultimate Fighting Championship
Fight of the Night (One time)  vs. Danny Henry

Kickboxing and Muay Thai
Regional championships
2008 Swedish National Muay Thai Championship  (-60 kg)
2008 Nordic Muay Thai Championship  (-60 kg)
2009 Swedish National Muay Thai Championship  (-63,5 kg)
2010 Swedish National Muay Thai Championship  (-63,5 kg)
2012 Swedish National Kickboxing Championship  (-67 kg)

Mixed martial arts record

 
|Loss
|align=center|7–4
|Chase Hooper
|TKO (elbow and punches)
|UFC 245 
|
|align=center|1
|align=center|4:34
|Las Vegas, Nevada, United States
|   
|-
|Win
|align=center|7–3
|Sung Bin Jo
|Decision (unanimous)
|UFC Fight Night: Gustafsson vs. Smith 
|
|align=center|3
|align=center|5:00
|Stockholm, Sweden
|
|-
|Loss
|align=center|6–3
|Chris Fishgold
|Submission (rear-naked choke) 
|UFC Fight Night: Błachowicz vs. Santos 
|
|align=center|2
|align=center|1:10
|Prague, Czech Republic
|
|-
|Loss
|align=center|6–2
|Julio Arce
|Submission (rear-naked choke) 
|UFC Fight Night: Rivera vs. Moraes
|
|align=center|3
|align=center|2:55
|Utica, New York, United States 
|
|-
|Loss
|align=center|6–1
|Danny Henry
|Decision (unanimous)
|UFC Fight Night: Nelson vs. Ponzinibbio 
|
|align=center|3
|align=center|5:00
|Glasgow, Scotland
|
|-
| Win
| align=center| 6–0
| Manolo Scianna
| TKO (punches)
| Battle of Botnia 2016
| 
| align=center| 1
| align=center| 1:06
| Umeå, Sweden
|
|-
| Win
| align=center| 5–0
| Davor Matic
| Submission (armbar)
| Scandinavian Fight Nights 1
| 
| align=center| 1
| align=center| N/A
| Stockholm, Sweden
|
|-
| Win
| align=center| 4–0
| Emerik Youmbi
| Submission (guillotine choke)
| Lions FC 6
| 
| align=center| 1
| align=center| 3:27
| Neuchatel, Switzerland
|
|-
| Win
| align=center| 3–0
| Svyatoslav Shabanov
| Submission (armbar)
| International Ring Fight Arena 7
| 
| align=center| 1
| align=center| 2:37
| Solna, Sweden
|
|-
| Win
| align=center| 2–0
| Alexander Denic
| TKO (punches)
| International Ring Fight Arena 6
| 
| align=center| 1
| align=center| 1:01
| Solna, Sweden
|
|-
| Win
| align=center| 1–0
| Piotr Pączek 
| TKO (leg kicks and punches)
| International Ring Fight Arena 5
| 
| align=center| 1
| align=center| 1:32
| Solna, Sweden
|
|-

See also
 List of current UFC fighters
 List of male mixed martial artists

References

External links

Daniel Teymur website

Living people
Lightweight mixed martial artists
Mixed martial artists utilizing Muay Thai
Mixed martial artists utilizing wrestling
Swedish male mixed martial artists
Swedish male kickboxers
Swedish Muay Thai practitioners
Sportspeople from Stockholm
1988 births
Ultimate Fighting Championship male fighters
Assyrian sportspeople
Swedish people of Assyrian/Syriac descent